The Melbourne Australia Temple is the 90th operating temple of the Church of Jesus Christ of Latter-day Saints (LDS Church).

History
On 30 October 1998 the LDS Church First Presidency announced that a temple would be built in Melbourne, Australia. The Melbourne Australia Temple is one of five temples in Australia. Previously, members from the area had traveled twelve hours one-way to visit the Sydney Australia Temple.

Missionary work was slow in Australia until the 1950s when the number of people joining the church suddenly exploded. In 1955 there were 3,000 members in Australia, five years later there were almost 10,000. By 1970 the number of members had more than tripled to 32,000. In 1980 it had jumped to 50,000. Today there are more than 100,000 members in Australia, making the LDS Church the fastest growing Christian church in the country.

On 20 March 1999 a groundbreaking ceremony and site dedication was held. The temple was open to the public for tours from 2–10 June 2000. Those who toured the  temple were able to see the craftsmanship, the Celestial room, two sealing rooms, two ordinance rooms, baptistery, and learn more about Mormon beliefs.

LDS Church president Gordon B. Hinckley dedicated the Melbourne Australia Temple on 16 June 2000. Four dedicatory services were held to accommodate all the members that wanted to attend. The temple serves 18,000 members in ten stakes from Victoria, Tasmania, and Southern New South Wales.

In 2020, the Melbourne Australia Temple was closed in response to the coronavirus pandemic.

See also

 Comparison of temples of The Church of Jesus Christ of Latter-day Saints
 List of temples of The Church of Jesus Christ of Latter-day Saints
 List of temples of The Church of Jesus Christ of Latter-day Saints by geographic region
 Temple architecture (Latter-day Saints)
 The Church of Jesus Christ of Latter-day Saints in Australia

References

Additional reading

External links
Melbourne Australia Temple Official site
Melbourne Australia Temple at ChurchofJesusChristTemples.org

20th-century Latter Day Saint temples
Religious buildings and structures in Melbourne
Temples (LDS Church) completed in 2000
Temples (LDS Church) in Australia
2000 establishments in Australia
Buildings and structures in the City of Knox